Valerie Mewes (2 August 1931 – 9 January 1955) was an English model and celebrity, better known by the name Vicki Martin.

Biography 
Stephen Ward, who was to become one of the central figures in the 1963 Profumo affair, claims to have met Mewes in a doorway in Oxford Street during a thunderstorm at night. Ward produced many female protégés, and it is said that Mewes was the prototype for these.

Mewes was best friends with Ruth Ellis, the last woman to be executed in the United Kingdom. The pair had both worked at Murray's Club in Soho, where Stephen Ward later met Christine Keeler.

In 1952, Mewes appeared, playing the part of a model in the film It Started in Paradise. The actress, Kay Kendall, who was a friend of Ward's, also appeared in the film. 

In 1953, Mewes gained notoriety as a result of her relationship with Jagaddipendra Narayan, the Maharajah of Cooch Behar, and in 1955, by the manner of her untimely death. It was said that she died driving back to London from an all-night party at Maidenhead to keep an early photo call, however, the true facts remained unclear.

The car in which Mewes died was being driven by the writer Terence Robertson, author of a number of books, including 'The Golden Horseshoe'. Robertson took his own life in January 1970.

External links
 Vicki Martin and The Maharajah of Cooch-Behar

Notes

1931 births
1955 deaths
English female models
Road incident deaths in England